Cryptantha micromeres is a species of flowering plant in the borage family known by the common name pygmyflower cryptantha.

It is native to California and Baja California, where it grows in woodland and chaparral.

Description
Cryptantha micromeres is a hairy annual herb growing a branching stem to heights between 10 and 50 centimeters. The leaves are up to 4 centimeters long, variable in shape and covered in bristles.

The inflorescence contains clusters of tiny bristly white flowers only a few millimeters wide.

References

External links
Jepson Manual Treatment of Cryptantha micromeres
USDA Plants Profile for Cryptantha micromeres

micromeres
Flora of California
Flora of Baja California
Flora of the Sierra Nevada (United States)
Natural history of the California chaparral and woodlands
Natural history of the California Coast Ranges
Natural history of the Central Valley (California)
Natural history of the Channel Islands of California
Natural history of the Peninsular Ranges
Natural history of the San Francisco Bay Area
Natural history of the Santa Monica Mountains
Natural history of the Transverse Ranges